The pituitary stalk (also known as the infundibular stalk, Fenderson's funnel, or simply the infundibulum) is the connection between the hypothalamus and the posterior pituitary. The floor of the third ventricle is prolonged downward as a funnel-shaped recess—the infundibular recess—into the infundibulum, where the apex of the pituitary is attached.
It passes through the dura mater of the diaphragma sellae as it carries axons from the magnocellular neurosecretory cells of the hypothalamus down to the posterior pituitary where they release their neurohypophysial hormones, oxytocin and vasopressin, into the blood.

This connection is called the hypothalamo-hypophyseal tract or hypothalamo-neurohypophyseal tract.

Damage to the pituitary stalk blocks the release of antidiuretic hormone, resulting in polydipsia (excessive water intake) and polyuria (excessive urination).

The diameter of the pituitary stalk at the level of optic chiasm is 3.3 mm, and at the pituitary gland insertion site is measured at 1.9 mm.

See also
Pituitary stalk interruption syndrome

Additional images

References

Endocrine system
Hypothalamus